Roy Asa Haynes (1881–1940) was United States Assistant Secretary of the Treasury in charge of Prohibition enforcement from 1920–1925. He was succeeded by political appointee Lincoln Clark Andrews, who reorganized the enforcement bureau. He was the editor of a daily newspaper in Hillsboro, Ohio.  Haynes was appointed by Warren Harding and considered a puppet of the Anti-Saloon League.

References

 

 
 
 

United States Assistant Secretaries of the Treasury
1881 births
1940 deaths